Elijah Elgebra Williams (born August 20, 1975) is an American former college and professional football player who was a defensive back and kick returner in the National Football League (NFL) for four seasons during the late 1990s and early 2000s.  Williams played college football for the University of Florida, and thereafter he played professionally for the Atlanta Falcons of the NFL.

Early years 

Williams was born in Milton, Florida in 1975.  He attended Milton High School, and played high school football for the Milton Panthers.

College career 

Williams accepted an athletic scholarship to attend the University of Florida in Gainesville, Florida, where he was a running back for coach Steve Spurrier's Florida Gators football teams from 1994 to 1997.  Memorably, he ran for 109 yards versus LSU Tigers and 116 yards against the Auburn Tigers in 1996  Williams led the Gators in rushing yardage in 1995 and 1996, and finished his four-year college career with 3,023 all-purpose yards—2,181 rushing and 842 receiving.  During his four college seasons, the Florida Gators won Southeastern conference (SEC) championships in 1994, 1995 and 1996, and the 1996 national championship when they defeated the Florida State Seminoles 52–20 in the Sugar Bowl.  He was chosen as a senior team captain in 1997.

Williams returned to Gainesville when his NFL career was over, and graduated from the University of Florida with a bachelor's degree in health science education in 2003.

Professional career 

He saw limited action as a running back, and played mostly on special teams as a kick returner and as a backup defensive back.

Life after the NFL 

Williams worked as a high school football coach from 2005 to 2012.  He was formerly the head coach for the Oak Ridge Pioneers football team of Oak Ridge High School in Orlando, Florida. He was also an assistant coach at Astronaut high school in Titusville, Fl.

Williams is currently the head coach at  Jones High School.

See also 

 Florida Gators football, 1990–99
 History of the Atlanta Falcons
 List of Florida Gators in the NFL Draft
 List of University of Florida alumni

References

Bibliography 

 Carlson, Norm, University of Florida Football Vault: The History of the Florida Gators, Whitman Publishing, LLC, Atlanta, Georgia (2007).  .
 Golenbock, Peter, Go Gators!  An Oral History of Florida's Pursuit of Gridiron Glory, Legends Publishing, LLC, St. Petersburg, Florida (2002).  .
 Hairston, Jack, Tales from the Gator Swamp: A Collection of the Greatest Gator Stories Ever Told, Sports Publishing, LLC, Champaign, Illinois (2002).  .
 McCarthy, Kevin M.,  Fightin' Gators: A History of University of Florida Football, Arcadia Publishing, Mount Pleasant, South Carolina (2000).  .
 Nash, Noel, ed., The Gainesville Sun Presents The Greatest Moments in Florida Gators Football, Sports Publishing, Inc., Champaign, Illinois (1998).  .

1975 births
Living people
People from Milton, Florida
Players of American football from Florida
American football defensive backs
American football return specialists
American football running backs
Florida Gators football players
Atlanta Falcons players